Loyal is a town in Kingfisher County, Oklahoma, United States. The population was 79 at the 2010 census.

History
A large share of the early settlers being natives of Germany, the original name of the settlement was "Kiel", after the city in northern Germany. In 1917 following American entry into World War I, the name was changed to "Loyal" due to rampant anti-German sentiment.

Geography

The town sits next to Cooper Creek, an east-flowing tributary of the Cimarron River.

Demographics

As of the census of 2000, there were 81 people, 35 households, and 22 families residing in the town. There were 43 housing units at an average density of 546.9 per square mile (207.5/km2). The racial makeup of the town was 81.48% White, 6.17% Native American, 9.88% from other races, and 2.47% from two or more races. Hispanic or Latino of any race were 9.88% of the population.

There were 35 households, out of which 31.4% had children under the age of 18 living with them, 45.7% were married couples living together, 14.3% had a female householder with no husband present, and 34.3% were non-families. 31.4% of all households were made up of individuals, and 11.4% had someone living alone who was 65 years of age or older. The average household size was 2.31 and the average family size was 2.65.

In the town, the population was spread out, with 28.4% under the age of 18, 4.9% from 18 to 24, 29.6% from 25 to 44, 28.4% from 45 to 64, and 8.6% who were 65 years of age or older. The median age was 38 years. For every 100 females, there were 72.3 males. For every 100 females age 18 and over, there were 81.3 males.

The median income for a household in the town was $18,750, and the median income for a family was $21,250. Males had a median income of $32,500 versus $20,625 for females. The per capita income for the town was $12,673. There were 38.1% of families and 34.2% of the population living below the poverty line, including 35.0% of under eighteens and none of those over 64.

Notable person
Al Brazle, baseball player

References

Towns in Kingfisher County, Oklahoma
Towns in Oklahoma